Nataša Kramberger (born 14 April 1983) is a Slovenian writer and journalist.

Life
She was born in Maribor and currently lives in Berlin. She is best known for her novel Nebesa v robidah: roman v zgodbah (Heaven in a blackberry bush: a novel in stories). It was nominated for the Kresnik Prize for best Slovenian novel and won the EU Prize for Literature in 2010. It was translated into Italian 2016 for Mimesis edizioni. It was translated to English in 2020 for Litterae Slovenicae by Kristina Reardon.

1983 births
Writers from Maribor
Living people
Writers from Berlin
Slovenian emigrants to Germany